Enrico Komning (born 6 August 1968, in Stralsund) is a German lawyer and politician. He is a member of Alternative for Germany (AfD).  In 2017 he became a member of the Bundestag.

Early life 
Komning earned his Abitur in 1988 and got a degree in construction work.

Career 
He became part of "Wachregiment "Feliks Dzierzynski", a division of Ministerium für Staatssicherheit, the political state security service of the German Democratic Republic. In 1991 Komning studied law at Ernst-Moritz-Arndt-Universität Greifswald.

Since Komning entered the Bundestag in November 2017. From then to July 2019 he earned €760,000. As a member of parliament he earns about 10,000 a month; Komning was earning €36,000 a month extra at his law firm.

Komning is a member of the Greifswald-based fraternity "Rugia". "Rugia" is part of Deutsche Burschenschaft. German Bundesamt für Verfassungsschutz said in January 2019 about "Rugia", it is a "group with right-wing extremist reference".

References

1968 births
Living people
People from Stralsund
Members of the German Burschenschaft
Members of the Bundestag 2021–2025
Members of the Bundestag 2017–2021
Members of the Bundestag for Mecklenburg-Western Pomerania
Members of the Bundestag for the Alternative for Germany